Idoia López Riaño is a former ETA hitwoman nicknamed "La Tigresa" (The Tigress) for her "sexual prowess".  She was jailed in the 1990s for a string of murders for the Basque terror group. 

Various newspapers have reported that author Luke Jennings had revealed the character of  Villanelle, the main antagonist of his Killing Eve series, was based upon Riaño. Jennings had said that Riaño, who had killed 23 people, "was clearly a psychopath, completely without empathy".

Riaño eventually expressed remorse for her crimes, and was released after 23 years (one year served for each of her victims).

References

Year of birth missing (living people)
Living people
Contract killers